The National Football League Most Valuable Player Award (NFL MVP) is an award given by various entities to the American football player who is considered the most valuable in the National Football League (NFL) during the regular season. Organizations which issue an NFL MVP award include the Associated Press (AP) and the Pro Football Writers of America (PFWA). Since the 2011 season, the NFL has held the annual NFL Honors ceremony, which recognizes the winner of the Associated Press MVP award.

Other organizations that previously issued an MVP include Sporting News and United Press International (UPI). The Newspaper Enterprise Association (NEA) awarded the Jim Thorpe Trophy.

List of winners

See also
 American Football League Most Valuable Player Award
 Bert Bell Award
 
 National Football League Defensive Player of the Year Award
 National Football League Offensive Player of the Year Award
 
 List of National Football League awards

References

General
 
 
 
 
 

Footnotes

National Football League trophies and awards
Most valuable player awards
National Football League Most Valuable Player Award winners